A television pilot (also known as a pilot or a pilot episode and sometimes marketed as a tele-movie), in United Kingdom and United States television, is a standalone episode of a television series that is used to sell a show to a television network or other distributor. A pilot is created to be a testing ground to gauge whether a series will be successful. It is, therefore, a test episode for the intended television series, an early step in the series development, much like pilot studies serve as precursors to the start of larger activity.

A successful pilot may be used as the series premiere, the first aired episode of a new show, but sometimes a series' pilot may be aired as a later episode or never aired at all. Some series are commissioned straight-to-series without a pilot. On some occasions, pilots that were not ordered to series may also be broadcast as a standalone television film or special.

A "backdoor pilot" is an episode of an existing series that heavily features supporting characters or guest stars in previously unseen roles. Its purpose is to introduce the characters to an audience before the creators decide on whether or not they intend to pursue a spin-off series with those characters.

Television networks use pilots to determine whether an entertaining concept can be successfully realized and whether the expense of additional episodes is justified. A pilot is best thought of as a prototype of the show that is to follow, because elements often change from pilot to series. Variety estimates that only a little over a quarter of all pilots made for American television proceed to the series stage.

Pilot season
Each summer, the major American broadcast television networks – including ABC, CBS, NBC, Fox, The CW, Univision, and Telemundo – receive about 500 brief elevator pitches each for new shows from writers and producers. That fall, each network requests scripts for about 70 pitches and, the following January, orders about 20 pilot episodes. Actors come to Los Angeles from within the area or elsewhere in the United States and around the world to audition for them. By spring, actors are cast and production crews assembled to produce the pilots.

Casting is a lengthy and very competitive process. For the 1994 pilot of Friends, casting director Ellie Kanner reviewed more than 1,000 actors' head shots for each of the six main roles. She summoned 75 actors for each role to audition, and she then chose some to audition again for the show's creators. Of this group, the creators chose some to audition again for Warner Bros. Television executives, who chose the final group of a few actors to audition for NBC executives; as they decide whether to purchase a pilot, network executives generally have ultimate authority over casting. Since the networks work on the same shared schedule, directors, actors and others must choose the best pilot to work for with the hopes that the network will choose it. If it is not chosen, they have wasted their time and money and may have missed out on better career opportunities.

Once they have been produced, the pilots are presented to studio and network executives, and in some cases to test audiences; at this point, each pilot receives various degrees of feedback and is gauged on its potential to advance from one pilot to a full-fledged series. Using this feedback, and factoring in the current status and future potential of their existing series, each network chooses about four to eight pilots for series status. The new series are then presented at the networks' annual upfronts in May, where they are added to network schedules for the following season (either for a fall or "mid-season" winter debut), and at the upfront presentation, the shows are shown to potential advertisers and the networks sell the majority of the advertising for their new pilots. The survival odds for these new series are low, as typically only one or two of them survive for more than one season.

Types of pilots

Premise pilot
A premise pilot introduces the characters and their world to the viewer; it is structured so that it can be run as the first episode of the series if substantial changes are not made between the pilot and greenlighting. In the event the changes being made are so substantial that they would cause confusion to viewers, the pilot (or portions of it) is often re-shot, recast, or rewritten to fit the rest of the series.

The pilot for Gilligan's Island, for instance, showed the castaways when they had just become stranded on the island. However, three roles were recast before going to series, with the characters either modified or completely altered to the point where the pilot could no longer be used as a regular episode. As a result, CBS aired Gilligan's second produced episode, which opened with the same scene of the characters just stranded on the island (showing only those not re-cast), first; the story from the pilot from that point onward was largely reworked into a flashback episode which aired later (with several key scenes re-shot). Even Gilligan's theme song, which was originally done as a calypso number, was rewritten and recomposed to be completely different.

Another example is Star Trek, where footage from the unaired original pilot, "The Cage", was incorporated into the two-part episode, "The Menagerie", with the story justification that it depicts events that happened several years earlier. Conversely, the second pilot for Star Trek, "Where No Man Has Gone Before", aired as the third episode of the show's first season, even though it included some casting and costuming differences that set it apart from the preceding episodes.

If a network orders a two-hour pilot, it will usually broadcast it as a television film to recoup some of its costs even if the network chooses to not order the show. Sometimes, a made-for-TV-movie is filmed as a pilot, but because of actors not being available, the series intro is reshot for the first aired episode. The original Cagney & Lacey movie co-starred Loretta Swit (of M*A*S*H fame) as Chris Cagney, but when she could not get out of her contract, they reshot it with Meg Foster, who after the first season was replaced with Sharon Gless; therefore, the original movie is not considered part of the television series, and is not included in the series collections on DVD. In some cases, this does not hamper broadcast, such as Jackie Cooper playing the role of Walter Carlson in the TV movie pilot of the 1975 series The Invisible Man, but being replaced by Craig Stevens for the remainder of the series; the pilot is still considered part of the series and released to DVD as such. Likewise, The Homecoming: A Christmas Story had an almost entirely different cast from the series it was intended to pilot (The Waltons), but both have been rerun for many years.

Proof of concept
A proof of concept pilot usually takes place chronologically further into a series run than a premise pilot, to give network executives a better feel for how a typical episode would appear (since a premise pilot may have to deviate from a typical episode in order to properly introduce characters). Remington Steele used both a proof of concept and a premise pilot. Proofs of concept were particularly common for game shows; in such cases, the pilot may be entirely or partially scripted (and thus, due to regulations passed after the 1950s quiz show scandals, illegal to broadcast in many jurisdictions) and use fake contestants and "returning champions" to demonstrate those concepts. The adventure series Lassie had both a premise pilot, "The Inheritance", designed specifically to air as the series' first episode, showing how Lassie's series owner, Jeff Miller, came to acquire her; and a proof of concept pilot, "The Well", showcased situations typical to the series, which aired well on into the first season of the series.

Backdoor pilot
A backdoor pilot is a film or miniseries that serves as a proof of concept for a full series, but may be broadcast on its own even if the full series is not picked up.  The term may also be used for an episode of an existing television show that serves to introduce a spin-off. Such backdoor pilots commonly focus on an existing character or characters from the parent series who are to be given their own show.

For example, to introduce A Different World, built around The Cosby Show character Denise Huxtable (Lisa Bonet), the Cosby Show episode "Hillman" was devoted to Denise's visit to the college that would become the new show's setting, and her encounters with some of the new show's supporting characters. A 2018 episode of ABC's 1980s-set sitcom The Goldbergs, titled "1990-Something", heavily featured teachers who were recurring characters on the series and served as the backdoor pilot to Schooled, which debuted in early 2019.

In other cases, however, an episode of the parent show may also focus on one or more guest characters who have not previously appeared in the show; for example, the JAG season eight episodes "Ice Queen" and "Meltdown" introduced the characters for what would become NCIS, while the NCIS season six two-part episode "Legend" introduced the characters for what would become the NCIS spin-off series NCIS: Los Angeles, and the NCIS season 11 two-part episode "Crescent City" introduced the characters for what would become NCIS: New Orleans. NCIS: Los Angeles itself also included a backdoor pilot for a potential further spin-off – NCIS: Red – but the series was not picked up.

Similarly, the backdoor pilot for the television sitcom Empty Nest was an episode of The Golden Girls, which relegated that show's regular stars to supporting characters in an episode devoted to new characters who were introduced as their neighbors. Feedback on the episode resulted in Empty Nest being extensively reworked before its debut; while the concept and the "living next to the Golden Girls" setting was retained, the series ended up featuring different characters from those in the original Golden Girls episode.

A 2011 episode of the TV Land original sitcom Hot in Cleveland focused on the wedding of the Elka character (Betty White). Boyce Ballentine (Cedric the Entertainer), an R&B singer-turned-preacher, was introduced as the pastor for the wedding, with the intention to give the Boyce character his own series on the network. That came to fruition in 2012, when TV Land introduced The Soul Man.

Not all backdoor pilots lead to a series. The Star Trek episode "Assignment: Earth" was a backdoor pilot for a spin-off of the same name, featuring a human named Gary Seven (played by Robert Lansing), taken from Earth's far past and raised by aliens to be sent to watch over Earth in the 1960s; while the series was not picked up, its characters have appeared in numerous non-canon Trek productions set in the 20th century. The third season two-part episode "Terra Firma" of Star Trek: Discovery is generally regarded as a backdoor pilot for a series featuring the character Philippa Georgiou. The final two episodes of the CBS sitcom Green Acres (1965–71) were both backdoor pilots. With CBS being pressured by advertisers to develop more urban-themed shows (ultimately at the expense of the network's rural-themed programs), Green Acres creator Jay Sommers was given an opportunity to develop two series ideas, both of which were rejected.

ABC attempted to create a spin-off of Charlie's Angels in 1980 called Toni's Boys. The backdoor pilot that aired near the end of season four was simply titled "Toni's Boys" and guest starred Barbara Stanwyck as Antonia "Toni" Blake, a wealthy widow and friend of Charlie Townsend's who ran a detective agency she inherited from her late husband. The agency was staffed by three handsome male detectives—Cotton Harper (Stephen Shortridge), Bob Sorensen (Bob Seagren), and Matt Parrish (Bruce Bauer)—who took direction from Toni and solved crimes in a manner similar to the Angels. The show was not picked up as a regular series for the following season.

The series finale of One Day at a Time in May 1984 served as a backdoor pilot to a spin-off featuring Pat Harrington, Jr.'s character of Dwayne Schneider in a new setting, but CBS ultimately passed on the potential series. Similarly, the 1988 two-part series finale of The Facts of Life ("The Beginning of the End" and "The Beginning of the Beginning") also served as a backdoor pilot that focused on the decision Blair Warner (Lisa Whelchel) made in using her trust fund to purchase the financially troubled Eastland Academy. Blair became headmistress and opened enrollment to male students for the first time in Eastland history. Up-and-coming actors Juliette Lewis, Mayim Bialik, Seth Green, and Meredith Scott Lynn were featured as some of Eastland's new students. NBC did not pick up the new series.

The Dukes of Hazzard aired two episodes, named "Jude Emery" and "Mason Dixon's Girls", which served as a backdoor pilot complete with the Dukes cast interacting with the new characters. Ultimately, CBS passed on the two series in favor of a series starring Hazzard County deputy Enos Strate. Another example within sitcoms would be a season 2 episode of The Nanny called "The Chatterbox", which centered around a struggling actress who gets a job at a barbershop owned by a single father. 

In an example from June 2010, Lifetime pursued a spinoff procedural drama of Army Wives featuring Brigid Brannagh's character, police officer Pamela Moran. The fourth-season episode "Murder in Charleston" was intended to serve as a backdoor pilot for the proposed spin-off. The episode sees Moran teaming up with an Atlanta-based detective on a murder that is related to a case she has been working on for the past three years. At the end of the episode, the detective encourages Moran to take a detective's exam, and to look for her if she is in Atlanta. In September 2010, however, Lifetime declined to pick up the project to series.

In 2013, The CW announced there was a spin-off of their genre hit Supernatural in the works. The 20th episode of season nine titled "Bloodlines", served as a back-door pilot, revealed in January 2014 to have been titled Supernatural: Bloodlines. The series was set to explore the "clashing hunter and monster cultures in Chicago". The show was not picked up by the CW for the 2014–2015 season due to dismal overall reception by viewers. The Gossip Girl episode "Valley Girls" was supposed to be a backdoor pilot for a prequel spin-off series starring Brittany Snow as a young Lily van der Woodsen, however the show was not picked up. "The Farm" was an episode of NBC's The Office that was supposed to act as a backdoor pilot for a spin-off series starring Rainn Wilson and focusing on his character, Dwight Schrute. Upon review, the spin-off was not picked up by NBC and the original version was never aired; instead it was reworked with additional material shot later, as the original version contained "certain aspects that were appropriate for a pilot of a new show".

The Arrow episode The Scientist served as a backdoor pilot for the spinoff series The Flash, introducing Barry Allen as a CSI searching for super-powered people in an attempt to find his mother's murderer. This episode also created the Arrowverse, a shared universe of interconnected DC Comics superhero TV series. The Heroes Join Forces crossover was a two-part backdoor pilot for another spinoff series set in the Arrowverse called Legends of Tomorrow, featuring a team of heroes and villains originally introduced in Arrow and the Flash. The series finale of Arrow, Green Arrow & The Canaries served as an unsuccessful backdoor pilot for a series of the same name. The 100 episode "Anaconda" also served as an unsuccessful backdoor pilot for a prequel series. 

A historically important venue for backdoor pilots has been the anthology series. They have variously been used as a place to show work still being actively considered for pickup, and as a venue for completed work already rejected by the network. With the decline of anthology series, backdoor pilots have increasingly been seen as episodes of existing series, one-off television films, and miniseries. As backdoor pilots have either failed to sell or are awaiting audience reception from its one-time broadcast, networks will not advertise them as pilots, only promoting them as a "special" or "movie". It is thus often unclear to initial viewers of backdoor pilots that they are seeing a pilot of any kind, unless they have been privy to knowledgeable media coverage of the piece.

Put pilot
A put pilot is a pilot that the network has agreed to air either as a special or series. If the network does not air the pilot episode, the network will owe substantial monetary penalties to the studio. Generally, this guarantees that the pilot will be picked up by the network.

Unsold pilot
An unsold pilot or "busted pilot" is a produced episode that never broadcasts, not turning into a television series. Variety estimates that only a little over a quarter of all pilots made for American television proceed to the series stage.

Test run
Instead of a single pilot episode, an alternative is a test run, a small number of episodes that air as a short-run series with the potential to go into full production if successful. This is particularly common among shows that are intended to be stripped (airing five days a week).

Talk shows occasionally use test runs. Metromedia and its successor Fox Corporation were particularly associated with using test runs for talk shows, with examples including The Wendy Williams Show, The Huckabee Show (a spin-off of Huckabee that aired for six weeks in summer 2010), the final version of The Jerry Lewis Show, and The Kilborn File, an unsuccessful comeback vehicle for Craig Kilborn.

10/90
In a 10/90 production model, a network broadcasts ten episodes of a new television program without ordering a pilot first. If the episodes achieve a predetermined ratings level, the network orders 90 more to bring the total to 100 episodes, immediately enough to rerun the show in syndication. Series that used the 10/90 model include Tyler Perry's House of Payne, Meet the Browns, For Better or Worse, Debmar-Mercury's Anger Management, and Are We There Yet?. Byron Allen's sitcoms followed a similar model, with Mr. Box Office and The First Family airing 26-episode first seasons with the intention of following them up with a full 104-episode order if successful; both series failed to reach the threshold Allen sought, though they remained in limited production (three to four new episodes a year, mixed in with the first season) for a few years afterward.

Other examples
An earlier variant was the 13-episode pilot run; in the late 1980s and early 1990s, Disney Channel notably gave a 13-episode pilot order to two series it never picked up, but would go on to longer runs on other networks: Good Morning, Miss Bliss (which also had a traditional pilot on NBC and would be revived by that network as Saved by the Bell) and the Canadian drama Hillside (which would move to Nickelodeon, Disney Channel's primary rival, and air as Fifteen).

As distinguished from the series premiere

A successful pilot is often used as the series premiere, the first aired episode of a new show, or it may be aired as a later episode or never aired at all. For the Canadian supernatural drama Lost Girl, the pilot that sold the series to Showcase, "Vexed", was used as the eighth episode of the first series. In the case of Firefly, the original pilot ("Serenity") which was intended to serve as the series premiere was rejected by the network, and a new first episode, "Train Job", was shot specifically for broadcast.

Sometimes, too, viewers will assign the word "pilot" to a work that represented the first appearances of characters and situations later employed by a series – even if the work was not initially intended as a pilot for the series. A good example of this is "Love and the Television Set" (later retitled "Love and the Happy Days" for syndication), an episode of Love, American Style that featured a version of the Cunningham family. It was in fact a failed pilot for the proposed 1972 series New Family in Town, but was recycled as a successful pilot for 1974's Happy Days. So firmly embedded is the notion of it as a Happy Days pilot, that even series actress Erin Moran (who did not appear in the episode) viewed it as such, as well as its creator, Garry Marshall, since Happy Days itself did not have a separate pilot of its own. In a similar situation, the 1962 pilot Howie was resurrected 13 years later to form the basis of The Paul Lynde Show.

On other occasions, the pilot is never broadcast on television at all. Viewers of Temple Houston, for example, would likely have considered "The Twisted Rope" its pilot because "The Man from Galveston" was only publicly exhibited in cinemas four months later. Even then, "The Man from Galveston" had an almost entirely different cast, and its main character was renamed to avoid confusion with the then-ongoing series.

Some television series are commissioned "straight-to-series" where a network orders a season without viewing any produced episodes, hence no episode is considered a pilot. For instance, "Invasion of the Bane", the first episode of The Sarah Jane Adventures, is not a pilot because the BBC had committed to the first season before seeing any filmed content – yet it is routinely referred to as a pilot. The straight-to-series model is usually used when established talent is attached to a series, or it is based on an established property or franchise. Amazing Stories (1985) is credited as being one of the first series commissioned without a pilot. The model has seen a rise since Netflix popularized it.

Theatrical release
A number of unsold pilots have been reworked into theatrically-released feature films, including Lum and Abner Abroad (1956), which wove together three pilot episodes for a 1956 series that would have starred the comedy duo of Lum and Abner; Agent for H.A.R.M. (1966); and Mulholland Drive (2001), which was composed of an unsold pilot episode appended with an ending shot specifically for the film.

In addition, a number of unsuccessful pilot episodes have been released as direct-to-video films, including Belle's Magical World (1998), Cruel Intentions 2 (2001) and Atlantis: Milo's Return (2003).

References

Further reading

External links
 NYTimes: No Smooth Ride on TV Networks’ Road to Diversity  (2009)
 Television Obscurities – Unsold Pilots on Television, 1956–1966
 Television Obscurities – Unsold Pilots on Television, 1967–1989
 Pilot Season Secrets: Are You Ready?

 
Pilot